Raúl González Sánchez (born June 5, 1967) is a boxer from Cuba, who won the silver medal in the Men's Flyweight Division (– 51 kg) at the 1992 Summer Olympics in Barcelona. In the final he lost to North Korea's Choi Chol-Su. Three years later, at the 1995 World Amateur Boxing Championships in Berlin, he captured the bronze medal in his weight division.

Career
U.S. boxer Rudolph Bradley said his first thought when Raúl González put him down was, "Man, he's strong. I knew the Cubans were strong but I didn't think he could put me down. Yeah, I was in trouble, but I was boxing and moving, trying to get my head back. I've never been stopped, I've been hit hard hundreds of times in Army fights."

Olympic results
Defeated Leszek Olszewski (Poland) 15-7
Defeated Moses Malagu (Nigeria) RSC 2 (0:23)
Defeated David Serradas (Venezuela) 14-7
Defeated Tim Austin (United States) RSC 1 (1:04)
Lost to Choi Chol-Su (North Korea) 2-12

References

 Profile

1967 births
Living people
Boxers at the 1995 Pan American Games
Boxers at the 1992 Summer Olympics
Olympic boxers of Cuba
Olympic silver medalists for Cuba
Olympic medalists in boxing
Cuban male boxers
AIBA World Boxing Championships medalists
Medalists at the 1992 Summer Olympics
Pan American Games silver medalists for Cuba
Pan American Games medalists in boxing
Flyweight boxers
Medalists at the 1995 Pan American Games
20th-century Cuban people